Arar F.C.  is a Saudi Arabian football team in Arar City playing at the Saudi Second Division.

Current squad 
As of Saudi Second Division:

References

External links
 Arar F.C. at Kooora.com 

Arar
1976 establishments in Saudi Arabia
Association football clubs established in 1976
Football clubs in Arar, Saudi Arabia